The Huaxia Elevated Road is a  long elevated expressway entirely in the Pudong New Area of Shanghai, a direct-controlled municipality in the People's Republic of China. It opened to traffic on 25 December 2009, and connects the Middle Ring Road with the Yingbin Expressway. It serves as a new roadway from Shanghai Pudong International Airport to the city centre. It makes the journey from Shanghai Pudong International Airport to the city centre in 30 minutes, and to Shanghai Hongqiao International Airport, via the Middle Ring Road, in 60 minutes. The route normally takes 70 percent of traffic flow to Shanghai Pudong International Airport.

References 

Expressways in Shanghai